Park Kang-Jin (born 9 August 1988) is a South Korean association footballer.

Career
He signed for former S.League club Super Reds FC when he was just 19, playing two seasons before the club was dissolved.

His debut for Balestier Khalsa after signing  from Gombak United for the 2012 S.League came against Tampines Rovers in a 1-0 win during the opening round of the season.

Honours
Balestier Khalsa
 Singapore Cup: 2014
 League Cup: 2013

References

External links
 
 http://www.goal.com/en-sg/news/3880/singapore/2013/10/30/4367194/one-on-one-singapore-is-home-away-from-home-for-korean-duo

1988 births
Living people
Association football midfielders
South Korean footballers
South Korean expatriate footballers
South Korean expatriate sportspeople in Singapore
Expatriate footballers in Singapore
Gombak United FC players
Balestier Khalsa FC players
Singapore Premier League players